Al-Marri or Al Marri (Arabic: المري) is a Saudi/Qatari surname that may refer to
Abdullah Al-Marri (born 1995), Qatari football player
Ali Rahma Al-Marri (born 1983), Qatari football midfielder
Ali Saleh Kahlah al-Marri, Qatari suspected terrorist
Fahad Al-Marri (born 1986), Qatari football referee
Jaralla al-Marri, Qatari suspected terrorist
Jaralla Al-Marri (footballer) (born 1988), Qatari football striker 
Mohammed Al-Marri (born 1994), Qatari football player

See also
Marri
Al Murrah

Arabic-language surnames